Caesar Nardi (died 1633) was a Roman Catholic prelate who served as Bishop of Ossero (1621–1633).

Biography
Caesar Nardi was born in 1572 and ordained a priest in the Order of Friars Minor Conventual. On 21 June 1621, he was appointed during the papacy of Pope Gregory XV as Bishop of Ossero. He served as Bishop of Ossero until his death in 1633.

References 

17th-century Roman Catholic bishops in Croatia
Bishops appointed by Pope Gregory XV
1633 deaths
Conventual Franciscan bishops